The Green Point Naval Boatyard was a shipyard on the southern bank of the Parramatta River at Green Point, Mortlake, Sydney, New South Wales, Australia. During World War II, 20 Fairmile B motor launches were assembled from hulls pre-fabricated in England at the shipyard. For at least part of the time the Shipyard was managed by Cecil Boden, who later became well known as a designer.

Ships built at Green Point Naval Boatyard
ML424
ML426
ML427
ML428
ML429
ML430
ML431
ML801
ML802
ML803
ML804
ML805
ML806
ML807
ML808
ML809
ML810
ML811
ML812
GPV962 (Walrus)
GPV967 (HMAS Jabiru) Completed April 1946
GPV968 (Tallarook)

References

Afloat, February 2006

Shipyards of New South Wales
Mortlake, New South Wales